The Derby Winner is a 1915 British silent sports drama film directed by Harold M. Shaw and starring Edna Flugrath, Gerald Ames and Mary Dibley. It is an adaptation of an 1895 play The Derby Winner by Henry Hamilton, Augustus Harris and Cecil Raleigh (which was retitled as The Sporting Duchess in the United States).

Cast
 Edna Flugrath - May Aylmer
 Gerald Ames - Captain Douglas Desburn
 Mary Dibley - Lady Muriel Fortescue
 Lewis Gilbert - Colonel Donnelly
 Christine Rayner - Annette Donnelly
 Wyndham Guise - Joe Aylmer
 Gwynne Herbert - Duchess
 J. L. Mackay - Captain Geoffrey Mostyn
 George Bellamy - Rupert Leigh
 Winifred Dennis - Mrs. Donnelly
 Harry Hargreaves - Doctor Cyprian Streatfield
 Will Asher - Dick Hand

References

External links

1915 films
1910s sports drama films
Films directed by Harold M. Shaw
British sports drama films
British silent feature films
British black-and-white films
1915 drama films
1910s English-language films
1910s British films
Silent sports drama films